Sar Bala (also Romanized as Sar Bālā) is a village in Pain Rokh Rural District, Jolgeh Rokh District, Torbat-e Heydarieh County, Razavi Khorasan Province, Iran. At the 2006 census, its population was 1,688, in 424 families.

References 

Populated places in Torbat-e Heydarieh County